Art Collector, formerly Australian Art Collector, is a quarterly art magazine. It primarily covers Australian contemporary and Indigenous Australian art, and also features New Zealand and international artists.

History
Art Collector was launched in 1997 in Sydney, Australia. Shortly after its foundation the magazine was briefly in the news when text from one of its articles was used without acknowledgement by art critic Robert Hughes, when writing for Time magazine.

Description
Art Collector is a quarterly art magazine, which features articles about artists, gallerists and art collectors; news of upcoming exhibitions in Australia and New Zealand, and issues affecting the art world. The magazine is available in print (sold in newsagents or by subscription) and online.

, the editor-in-chief is Susan Borham. Camilla Wagstaff is  Editorial Director, while Rose of Sharon Leake is Editor.

Features and publications
As of 2006 the magazine was best known for its annual features 50 Things Collectors Should Know, Art Under 5k, Undiscovered, and the Annual NATSIAA Roundup, which are referenced by other sources and collectors.

In issue 38, October–December 2006, the Queensland art critic Rex Butler profiled the work of Aboriginal artist Richard Bell.

In 2009, Art Collector published its first Guide to Indigenous Art Centres. In the same year it also published the Guide to Public & Regional Galleries and the Collector's Guidebook, a directory of services for art collectors. In 2019, Art Collector published a new edition of the Guide to Indigenous Art Centres, which featured stories on ethically sourcing Indigenous art and how to be certain of provenance.

Art collectors featured in the magazine have included Simon Mordant, Corbett and Yueji Lyon (whose collection is housed in the Lyon Housemuseum), John Kaldor, Gene Sherman and  Colin and Elizabeth Laverty.

References

External links
 

1997 establishments in Australia
Arts magazines published in Australia
Australian art
Magazines established in 1997
Magazines published in Sydney
Quarterly magazines published in Australia